Bandung Regency (Kabupaten Bandung) is an administrative landlocked regency located to the south, southeast, east and northeast of the city of Bandung.  The northern parts of the Bandung Regency are effectively part of the Bandung Metropolitan Area (technically the whole of the Regency is within the Metropolitan Area), with the southern third being less urbanized and jutting upwards from the Valley, though not as sharply as the mountain range to the immediate north of Bandung.  The Regency is part of the Indonesian province of West Java, and is situated about 75 miles southeast of Jakarta. The town of Soreang is the regency seat.

The Regency was reduced in size as first Cimahi City (which became autonomous) and then West Bandung Regency were split off from the regency.  In the 2010 Census, the population of the residual area reached 3,178,543 after final adjustments, while the 2020 Census increased the total to 3,623,790; the official estimate as at mid 2021 was 3,666,156, for an average density of roughly 2,080 per square kilometre. It is the second most populous (after Bogor Regency) of the regencies of Indonesia.

Administration 
Bandung Regency current regent is Dadang Supriatna along with Sahrul Gunawan as vice regent.

Administrative districts 
Bandung Regency is divided into thirty-one districts (kecamatan), encompassing 280 administrative villages (desa and kelurahan). The districts are listed below with their areas and their populations at the 2010 Census and 2020 Census, together with the official estimates as at mid 2021. The table also includes the location of the district administrative centres, the number of villages (rural desa and urban kelurahan) in each village, and its post code. 

Note that Cimenyan, Cilrengkrang and Cileunyi Districts (which lie immediately to the north and east of the city) and Bojongsoang, Dayeuhkolot, Margahayu and Margaasih Districts (which lie immediately to the south of the city) are virtually extensions to the built-up area of Bandung.

Neighbouring administrations
Bandung Regency is bordered by: 
 North = West Bandung Regency, Cimahi city, Bandung city, Subang Regency, Sumedang Regency.
 East = Sumedang Regency, Garut Regency.
 South = Garut Regency, Cianjur Regency.
 West = Cianjur Regency, West Bandung Regency.

Nature reserves 

 Mount Tilu (Nature Reserve) in Pangalengan and Pasirjambu.
 Patengan (Nature Reserve) in Rancabali.
 Malabar (Nature Reserve) in Pangalengan.
 Mount Patuha (Nature Reserve) in Rancabali and Pasirjambu with the Kawah Putih tourist site.
 Situ Cisanti (Nature Reserve) in Kertasari

Mountains and volcanoes
 Mount Tilu in Pangalengan.
 Mount Waringin in Pasirjambu and Pangalengan.
 Malabar Mountain, Besar Peak in Pangalengan, Puntang Peak in Cimaung, Haruman Peak in Pangalengan and Cimaung, Malabar Peak in Pacet, and also several peaks in Pangalengan, Cimaung, Banjaran, and Pacet.
 Mount Riung Gunung in Pangalengan.
 Mount Maud in Pasirjambu.
 Mount Kendang in Kertasari.
 Mount Bedil in Pangalengan.
 Mount Kencana in Pangalengan.
 Mount Mandalawangi in Rancabali and Ciwidey.
 Mount Patuha volcano in Rancabali and Pasirjambu with Kawah Putih crater nearby.
 Wayang volcano in Pangalengan and Kertasari.
 Windu volcano in Pangalengan.
 Manglayang volcano in Cimenyan and Cikacung.
 Kawah Ciwidey volcano in Pasirjambu.
 Papandayan volcano in Kertasari.
 Kamojang volcano in Ibun.

Because of the mountainous nature of parts of the Bandung District, major landslides are a significant natural hazard for the people of the District.  In February 2010, for example, over 15 people were killed in a large landslide in the Ciwidey area.

Industry 
Various local manufacturing activities take place in the District including the following.
 KPBS, Koperasi Peternakan Bandung Selatan (milk producer) (Pangalengan)
 Asia Sport (Apparel) (Katapang)
 Ceres (Chocolate) (Dayeuhkolot)
 PanAsia Indosyntec (Textiles) (Dayeuhkolot)
 Polyfin (Cileunyi)
 PT Mitra Rajawali Banjaran (Condoms) (Banjaran) received the 2010 ASEAN Business Development Award for best quality. The factory produces around 18.7 million condoms a year, 65 percent of which are for export

Sport 

Bandung regency has an impressive stadium, the best and well known in West Java Province, it is the Si Jalak Harupat stadium, the home base stadium for Persikab Bandung and Persib Bandung the two football teams from this region. A representative athletic track located in the town of Pangalengan.

Cuisine 
This area has a unique cuisine, such as Milk Caramels (in Pangalengan), Fresh Milk (in Pangalengan), Milk Snack (in Pangalengan), Bandrek (in Ciwidey), Borondong (in Majalaya)

Transport 
Transport to the Bandung Regency mainly is from Bandung. No major bus terminals, train stations or airports are located in the region. Traditional transport arrangements such as the delman horse passenger carriages are found in such places as the Banjaran Sub- district.

Nagreg Ring Road
To ease traffic jams in the Nagreg hill area close to Bandung, in 2011 the government completed part of the Nagreg ring road (5.4 km in length, 10 degrees in steepness, with a 400 meters semi-tunnel) at a cost of Rp.90 billion (around $US 10.6 million). The ring road will serve vehicles from travelling from south to north and can be used during Eid ul-Fitr 2011.  Traffic from north to south will still use the old road.

See also 
 List of regencies and cities of Indonesia

References

External links
  Official website of Bandung Regency
 Komunitas Bandung